is an animation producer currently working as a director for Studio Comet.

Productions
Credits are for producer unless otherwise specified.
Ashita Tenki ni Naare
Captain Tsubasa: Ayaushi! Zen Nippon Jr.
Captain Tsubasa: Europe Daikessen
Cho Hatsumei Boy Kanipan
Dr. Rin ni Kiite Mite!
Hatsumei Boy Kanipan (associate producer)
High School! Kimengumi (TV series and movie)
The Little Prince
Mamotte! Lollipop (animation coordinator)
Manga Nihonshi
Meimon! Daisan Yakyūbu
Sasuga no Sarutobi
Tsuyoshi Shikkari Shinasai

External links
 Japan Movie Database

Year of birth missing (living people)
Living people
Japanese television producers